John Shively Knight (October 26, 1894 – June 16, 1981) was an American newspaper publisher and editor based in Akron, Ohio.

Early life and education
Knight was born in Bluefield, West Virginia, to Charles Landon Knight and Clara Irene Shively. Known to his family and friends as "Jack," he attended Cornell University but never graduated, leaving early to enlist in the Army. While at Cornell he was a member of the Phi Sigma Kappa fraternity. However, he later received the degree of "War Alumnus."

Career
In 1920 he started at his father's newspaper, The Akron Beacon Journal, as sportswriter, and moved up to managing editor before inheriting the paper in 1933. In 1923, Knight served as the fourth president of the Akron Host Lions Club. Beginning a nationwide expansion, Knight bought the Miami Herald in 1937. His national Knight Newspapers chain, headquartered in Akron, eventually also included the Philadelphia Inquirer, Chicago Daily News, Charlotte Observer, Tallahassee Democrat, Lexington Herald and Leader, and Macon Telegraph.

During the latter part of World War II, Knight took a leave from the newspaper business, serving as Director of the U.S. Office of Censorship, in London.

By 1973, his portfolio included fifteen newspapers. A year later, 1974, he merged his company with Ridder Publications to form Knight-Ridder Newspapers Inc.

He co-founded what would become the John S. and James L. Knight Foundation with his brother James L. Knight.

Honors and awards

 His nationwide column, "The Editor's Notebook," won him the 1968 Pulitzer Prize for editorial writing. 
 In 1969 Knight received the Elijah Parish Lovejoy Award as well as an honorary Doctor of Laws degree from Colby College.

Personal life
John Knight lost first his wife, Katherine, and then two of three sons at early ages. Lieutenant John S. Knight, Jr. was killed in action near Münster, Germany on March 29, 1945.
 Youngest son Frank McLain Knight died at age thirty on March 9, 1958 following emergency brain surgery. 

In retirement, John Knight devoted much of his time to the raising of Thoroughbred race horses at his Fourth Estate Stable based in Miami.

Knight died of a heart attack in Akron.

Dedications
The John S. Knight Auditorium is a large lecture hall in Leigh Hall, a building on the campus of the University of Akron.
The John S. Knight Reading Room is located in Bierce Library, a building on the campus of the University of Akron.
The John S. Knight Center is a large convention center in downtown Akron.
The John S. Knight Institute for Writing in the Disciplines at Cornell University.
The John S. Knight Journalism Fellowships at Stanford support journalists from around the world in exploring solutions to issues facing innovation, entrepreneurship and leadership in journalism, thanks to a $4 million grant from the John S. and James L. Knight Foundation in 1984.

References

Further reading 
 Carmody, Deirdre. (June 17, 1981). "A Writer and a Businessman". The New York Times, p. 5.
 John S. Knight biography via University of Akron
 Whited, Charles. Knight: A Publisher in the Tumultuous Century. E P Dutton 1st edition December 1, 1988. 
 Hoyt, Clark. "John S. Knight – An Appreciation". John S. Knight Journalism Fellowships at Stanford, January 1, 2002. Via Stanford University.

External links
  Photo

1894 births
1981 deaths
Military personnel from West Virginia
American military personnel of World War I
American newspaper editors
American newspaper chain founders
American racehorse owners and breeders
20th-century American newspaper publishers (people)
Cornell University alumni
Elijah Parish Lovejoy Award recipients
Journalists from West Virginia
Maria Moors Cabot Prize winners
Businesspeople from Akron, Ohio
People from Bluefield, West Virginia
Pulitzer Prize for Editorial Writing winners
Knight family (newspapermen)
20th-century American journalists
American male journalists